Leptospira wolbachii is a saprophytic species of Leptospira.

References

wolbachii
Bacteria described in 1987